The Ouachita Division was a  railway line owned and operated by the Little Rock, Mississippi River and Texas Railway in southeastern Arkansas. The line originated in Trippe (near Arkansas City) where it connected to the Little Rock Division (Arkansas Valley Route), and eventually terminated in Warren. This subdivision was formerly the Mississippi, Ouachita and Red River Railroad mainline.

References

Little Rock, Mississippi River and Texas Railway
Passenger rail transportation in Arkansas
Rail infrastructure in Arkansas
Railway lines in the United States
Railway lines opened in 1882